Carmelo Borg Pisani (10 August 1915 – 28 November 1942) was a Maltese artist and Italian Fascist spy, condemned to death for treason in 1942.

Early life

Born into a Maltese Nationalist family in Senglea on 10 August 1915, Borg Pisani enrolled as a student at the pro-Italian Umberto I art lyceum in Valletta. In his teens he attended the network of pro-Italian and pro-fascist organisations in Malta: Valletta's Casa del Fascio (headed by professor Umberto Biscottini) and OGIE (Organizzazioni Giovanili Italiane all'Estero), through which he attended youth camps in Italy, such as Campo Dux in Viareggio in 1930 and another camp in Rome in 1932.

He moved to Italy to attend the Accademia di belle arti di Roma along with other prominent Maltese artists such as Emvin Cremona. He lived in the Italian government-funded "Casa della Redenzione Maltese", where he met other Maltese irredentists, with whom he shared the conviction that the British colonial government was destroying the "Italian soul" of Malta. He also believed that the best opportunity to restore Malta to its original state was to expel the British and unite the island to the Kingdom of Italy. In Rome, Borg Pisani chaired the “Circolo degli Amici della Storia di Malta”  and joined the “Comitato d'Azione Maltese”, headed by exiled  activist Carlo Mallia from the University of Malta. As Director,  Borg Pisani took part in the publication in exile of the irredentist newspaper Malta, which had been forbidden by the British colonial authority.

Borg Pisani was a supporter of fascism. In 1935, he unsuccessfully tried to embark as a volunteer for the fascist war in Ethiopia. 

Between 1939 and 1940, he joined the Gruppi Universitari Fascisti and then the Partito Nazionale Fascista.

During World War II

After the entry of Italy in the Second World War on 10 June 1940, Borg Pisani renounced his British citizenship, returning his British passport through the American embassy (which represented British interests in Rome). Yet he never formally requested nor obtained Italian citizenship, despite later serving in the Italian army.

He also wrote a letter to Mussolini to volunteer for service, but was refused by the Italian Army due to his strong myopia. Thanks to recommendations, including Biscottini's, Pisani was admitted into the blackshirts, the fascist militia, and later also joined the Servizio Informazioni Militari, the military intelligence. With the blackshirts he participated in the Italian occupation of Kefallinia in Greece, where he was injured. 

Together with other Maltese irredentists he then attended the military school of Messina.

On 18 May 1942, Borg Pisani volunteered for an espionage mission to Malta, to check British defences and help prepare for the planned Axis invasion of the island (Operation Herkules). He disembarked at the Dingli Cliffs in Ras id-Dawwara, and transferred all his rations to a cave that he knew well from his youth. Unusually inclement weather and a rough sea, however, washed all his possessions away within 48 hours, and he proved unable to climb the cliffs. He was forced to wave down a local boat. Upon rescue by a British patrol boat, he was brought to the naval hospital RNH Mtarfa.

There, Borg Pisani was recognized by one of his childhood friends, Cpt. Tom Warrington, who denounced him. British Intelligence kept him under arrest in a house in Sliema till August. He was then transferred to Corradino prison, accused of treason. On 12 November 1942 he stood trial under closed doors in front of three judges, headed by Chief Justice of Malta Sir George Borg, and defended by two lawyers. His plea that he had renounced British citizenship by returning his passport and acquisition of Italian citizenship (which would have granted him status of prisoner of war) was not upheld by the military court. On 19 November 1942 he was publicly sentenced to death for espionage, for taking up arms against the Government and forming part of a conspiracy to overthrow the government. His execution by hanging took place at 7:30AM on Saturday, 28 November, after rejection of pleas for reversal and for clemency. His remains, initially buried inside Corradino Prison, are now in the ossuary of the cemetery of Paola.

According to Mark Harwood, Borg Pisani might have been betrayed by the Italian Fascists themselves, who by sending him alone on an espionage mission to Malta (where he was very likely to be captured and executed) could have been looking for a propaganda coup against the British with the Maltese population at the height of the war — but the plan did not work. 
Frank Leighton considered him "a gullible victim of fascist Italy's propaganda".

Legacy

In Italy, Borg Pisani was posthumously awarded the Gold Medal of Military Valor, the highest Italian military award, by King Victor Emmanuel III a few days after his death. 

Benito Mussolini called him a "Maltese Martyr" and in November 1943 created in his honour in Liguria the blackshirts Battaglione Borg Pisani in which other Maltese irredentists fought. 

The art academy where he had studied in Rome was for a brief time rechristened La Regia Accademia di Belle Arti Borg Pisani, and streets in Rome, Turin, Bari and Legnano are still named after him. A neo-fascist group commemorated his death in front of Malta's embassy in Rome in 2010.

Italian historian Giulio Vignoli wrote that Borg Pisani is to be considered one of the last Italian "Risorgimento" martyrs of the Italian irredentism, like Cesare Battisti and Nazario Sauro.

Requests have been made by his family and the Italian government to exhume his body and give it a burial outside prison grounds, so far not acceded to.

In Malta, Norman Lowell, the leader of the far-right political party Imperium Europa, is known to be a staunch admirer of Carmelo Borg Pisani. He is known for the quotes "Carmelo Borg Pisani, presente!" and "Onore a Carmelo Borg Pisani!" during a tribute to him in an interview on One.

A person similar to Pisani appears in the 1953 film, Malta Story.

Further reading

Notes

References

Bibliography

External links

 A hero and a martyr or a spy and a traitor – who was Carmelo Borg Pisani?, TVM, December 2018
"Medaglia d'oro al Valor Militare alla memoria" awarded to him after his death (with photo of Carmelo Borg Pisani). 

1915 births
1942 deaths
Executed Maltese people
Italian irredentism
Italian revolutionaries
Italian spies
World War II spies for Italy
Executed Italian people
People from Senglea
Recipients of the Gold Medal of Military Valor
People executed by the Crown Colony of Malta by hanging
Executed spies
People executed by the United Kingdom by hanging
Collaborators with Fascist Italy
Maltese artists
People executed for treason against the United Kingdom